Shigang Chen from the University of Florida in Gainesville was named Fellow of the Institute of Electrical and Electronics Engineers (IEEE) in 2016 for contributions to quality of service provisioning and policy-based security management in computer networks.

Chen got his B.S. in computer science from the University of Science and Technology of China in 1993 and then got his M.S. and Ph.D. degrees in the same field from the University of Illinois at Urbana–Champaign in 1996 and 1999, respectively. Following graduation, he worked with Cisco Systems and in 2002 became an assistant professor at the University of Florida. In 2008, he was promoted to an associate professor and by 2013 became professor at the same institution.

References

External links

20th-century births
Living people
Chinese computer scientists
University of Science and Technology of China alumni
Grainger College of Engineering alumni
University of Florida faculty
Fellow Members of the IEEE
21st-century American engineers
Year of birth missing (living people)
Place of birth missing (living people)